Aluminosis (also known as aluminium lung) is a restrictive lung disease caused by exposure to aluminum-bearing dust. Aluminosis is a form of pneumoconiosis that can lead to pulmonary fibrosis. First cases of lung damage from aluminium exposure were reported in 1930s in Germany. It can be detected by using high-resolution computed tomography. Findings may vary, showing nodular or slightly irregular opacities that may merge into more prominent forms, most frequently in the upper lung fields, sometimes in the lower lung fields, and less frequently a diffuse micro nodular pattern. In severe cases, pulmonary fibrosis with honeycombing was described.

Workers exposed to aluminium dust are often involved in industries such as explosives manufacturing (where aluminium powder is involved), aluminium welding (and grinding), and bauxite smelting.

References

External links 

 https://icdlist.com/icd-10/J63.0

Lung diseases due to external agents
Occupational diseases
Respiratory diseases